Ha fatto tredici is a 1951 Italian comedy film directed by Carlo Manzoni.

Cast
 Carlo Croccolo as Mario Rossi
 Riccardo Billi as himself
 Mario Riva as himself
 Antonella Lualdi as Mirella
 Virgilio Riento as Cav. Brusaglia
 Nyta Dover
 Giulio Stival as Direttore dell'hotel
 Nerio Bernardi
 Anna Carena
 Beniamino Maggio as Fattorino dell'hotel
 Silvana Pampanini
 Camillo Pilotto
 Franca Rame
 Marco Tulli

External links
 

1951 films
1950s Italian-language films
Italian comedy films
1951 comedy films
Films scored by Giovanni Fusco
Italian black-and-white films
1950s Italian films